Tilen Kodrin (born 14 May 1994) is a Slovenian handball player who plays for VfL Gummersbach and the Slovenian national team.

He participated at the 2017 World Men's Handball Championship.

References

External links

1994 births
Living people
Slovenian male handball players
Sportspeople from Celje
Expatriate handball players
Slovenian expatriate sportspeople in Germany
Handball-Bundesliga players
Mediterranean Games competitors for Slovenia
Competitors at the 2018 Mediterranean Games